Bradford and Airedale Teaching Primary Care Trust was the name of the publicly funded healthcare system which serves the City of Bradford and Airedale in West Yorkshire and is part of the NHS. The teaching primary care trust governs healthcare services in the area and like most NHS services, the majority of services are free at the point of use. It was abolished in April 2013.

The teaching primary care trust provided primary health care and community services or commissions them from other providers.

The teaching primary care trust merged from four separate primary care trusts (Airedale, North Bradford, South and West, and City) in 2007.

Bradford and Airedale Teaching Primary Care Trust is also a teaching primary care trust, which has specific hospitals where medical students can learn in a practical setting.

The teaching primary care trust is managed by a board of directors made up of eight directors and headed by a chief executive, Simon Morritt. The chairman of the trust is a non-executive director, John Chuter OBE.

The finances of the teaching primary care trust, like most primary care trusts and teaching primary care trusts, are largely determined by directives set by the strategic health authority or the Department of Health.

See also
History of the National Health Service
National Health Service
List of primary care trusts in England
Primary care
Primary health care
WikiProject National Health Service

References

External links
 Bradford and Airedale tPCT Homepage
 Bradford and Airedale tPCT Strategy
 NHS Choices The NHS website
 NHS Direct
 Department of Health introduction to the NHS
 NHS connecting for health
 NHS history - From Cradle to Grave, detailed study by Geoffrey Rivett
 Chronology of NHS reform
 The "Matchbox on a Muffin": The Design of Hospitals in the Early NHS (pdf)
Celebrating 60 years of the NHS
'BIRTH OF THE NATIONAL HEALTH SERVICE| How the state of the nation's health became a political ideal' 

Defunct NHS trusts
Health in Yorkshire